Psorospermium haeckeli (or Psorospermium haeckelii) is a parasitic species.

References 

Parasitic opisthokonts
Mesomycetozoea